Big Bend Dam is a major embankment rolled-earth dam on the Missouri River in Central South Dakota, United States, creating Lake Sharpe. The dam was constructed by the U.S. Army Corps of Engineers as part of the Pick-Sloan Plan for Missouri watershed development authorized by the Flood Control Act of 1944. Construction began in 1959 and the embankment was completed in July 1963. Power generation began at the facility in 1964 and the entire complex was completed in 1966 at a total cost of $107 million. The hydroelectric plant generates 493,300 kilowatts of electricity at maximum capacity, with an annual production of 969 million kilowatt hours, and meets peak-hour demand for power within the Missouri River Basin.

Located near Fort Thompson, South Dakota, just south of the Big Bend of the Missouri River, a large meander, Big Bend Dam creates Lake Sharpe, named after South Dakota Governor Merrill Q. Sharpe. The lake extends for  up the course of the Missouri River passing through Pierre, the State Capitol, to Oahe Dam, another major power-generating and flood control dam.

South Dakota Highway 47 crosses over the dam, connecting Lyman and Buffalo Counties.

The next dam upstream is Oahe Dam, near Pierre, and the next dam downstream is Fort Randall Dam, near Pickstown.

Native American tribes
The construction of the dam resulted in the dislocation of people on the Crow Creek and Lower Brule Reservations. The flooding of the land for the reservoir also resulted in the loss of limited plant life resources used by them for food and medicine.

A monument at Big Bend Dam dedicated in 2002, the Spirit of the Circle Monument, honors the more than 1,300 people who died over a three-year period in the 1860s at the Crow Creek Reservation near the present site of the dam.

2011 Missouri River flood
For the first time in the dam's history, the US Army Corps of Engineers opened the dam's spillway gates on the morning of June 3, 2011. In response to the 2011 Missouri River Floods, the dam was releasing , which greatly exceeded its previous record release of  set in 1997.

See also

 Lake Sharpe
 Pick-Sloan Plan
 U.S. Army Corps of Engineers
 Crow Creek Indian Reservation
 Lower Brule Indian Reservation

References

External links

 U.S. Army Corps of Engineers - Big Bend Dam
 Daily Reservoir Levels and Water Releases - U.S. Army Corps of Engineers.

Dams in South Dakota
Dams on the Missouri River
Hydroelectric power plants in South Dakota
Buildings and structures in Buffalo County, South Dakota
Buildings and structures in Lyman County, South Dakota
United States Army Corps of Engineers dams
Energy infrastructure completed in 1964
Dams completed in 1966
Earth-filled dams